Crisis at the Castle is a three-part documentary series that aired on BBC Four and American public broadcasting stations in 2007. The series chronicled the financial troubles at British castles Kelburn Castle, Ayrshire, Burton Court, Herefordshire and Sudeley Castle, Gloucestershire.

External links 
Episode guide at bbc.co.uk
Description at American Public Television

BBC television documentaries